Charles Grimes (24 February 1772 – 19 February 1858) was an English surveyor who worked in colonial Australia. He served as Surveyor General of New South Wales and found the Yarra River in what is now the state of Victoria. During his career, he mapped the route of the Hobart Road, Tasmania's main north-south arterial route. Much of the modern Midland Highway still follows the route that he planned.

Early life
Grimes was born in Aylesbury, Buckinghamshire, England, son of Joseph Grimes, a laceman, and his wife Esther. Towards the end of 1790 Grimes was appointed deputy surveyor of roads in New South Wales and allocated work at Norfolk Island. From there he went to Norfolk Island. Soon after his arrival on 4 November 1791, Governor King appointed him deputy surveyor-general of New South Wales.

Surveying in Australia
At Norfolk Island he was employed correcting a previous survey which had been made without proper instruments, and he also undertook some of the administrative work. Grimes returned to Sydney in April 1794 and with the surveyor-general Augustus Alt being in bad health, he was required to take over most of Alt's work. In February 1795 he sailed north in the Francis and spent approximately one week at Port Stephens and reported unfavourably on the locality.

Grimes is responsible for fully surveying the Hunter River in November 1801 with Francis Barrallier. On 30 January 1803, whilst on his survey of Port Phillip he and his party landed at Frankston where he met around thirty Indigenous people. On 2 February 1803 he reached the mouth of the Yarra River. Next day Grimes ascended the river in a boat and explored what is now the Maribyrnong River for several miles. Returning to the Yarra it was explored for several miles but the boat was stopped by Dights Falls. The journal of another member of the party, James Flemming, has been preserved, and in it he several times refers to finding good soil. Although it was evidently a dry season Flemming, who was described by King as "very intelligent", thought from the appearance of the herbage that "there is not often so great a scarcity of water as at present". He suggested that the "most eligible place for a settlement I have seen is on the Freshwater (Yarra) River". A plaque at the site marks the event. Grimes returned to Sydney on 7 March 1803 and, in spite of Flemming's opinions, reported adversely against a settlement at Port Phillip.

Some accounts state that Grimes acquired a block of land in Sydney from Robert Ryan. Grimes sold the land to Robert Campbell in about 1806.

Grimes obtained leave of absence and went to England in August 1803. It was nearly three years before he was back in Sydney. In March 1807 he was sent to Port Dalrymple, and using the advice of Thomas Laycock, who a month earlier had become the first European to traverse the interior of Tasmania, Grimes made a survey of the district and examined the route to Hobart. Much of the route he surveyed became the Hobart Road, and many sections of the original 1808 road still form part of the Midland Highway.

Grimes returned at the end of the year, and became involved in the deposition of Governor William Bligh in the Rum Rebellion on 26 January 1808. He was one of the members of a committee formed to examine the administration of Bligh, and was appointed acting judge-advocate. In this capacity, he sat at the token trial of John Macarthur. Grimes realised, however, that his lack of legal training made it difficult for him to act effectively in his judicial position and he resigned on 5 April 1808. He was sent to England with dispatches that same month.

Later life in the army
Grimes was not well received in England, and his salary was held back for a long period because of his association with the mutineers. Grimes resigned his position on 18 July 1811. The following year he became a paymaster of the 13th Regiment of the British Army and served in Canada, Great Britain and India. He was appointed paymaster at the recruiting depot, Maidstone, in September 1833 and was transferred to Chatham, Kent in 1836. He retired from the army on a pension in July 1848, and died at Milton-next-Gravesend, Kent on 19 February 1858.

Grimes had two sons in New South Wales by Elizabeth Matthews. In 1815 he married Cassandra Atkinson in Woodford, Essex, and they had four children.

A bridge over the Yarra at Melbourne Docklands was named after him. Built in the 1970s, it has subsequently been substantially altered and was officially re-opened on 16 September 2000.

References
John Currey (ed.), James Fleming, A Journal of Grimes' Survey: The Cumberland in Port Phillip January – February 1803, Banks Society Publications, Malvern [Vic.], 2002

Bernard T. Dowd, 'Grimes, Charles (1772–1858)', Australian Dictionary of Biography, Volume 1, MUP, 1966, pp 487–488. Retrieved on 29 December 2008

History of Melbourne
Explorers of Australia
English surveyors
People from Aylesbury
1772 births
1858 deaths
19th-century Australian public servants
Surveyors General of New South Wales